Groovin' is an album by the trumpeter Idrees Sulieman recorded in 1985 and released on the SteepleChase label.

Reception

Scott Yanow of AllMusic reviewed the album, writing, "Five days short of his 62nd birthday, Idrees Sulieman was still in fine form for this record."

Track listing 
 "Groovin' High" (Dizzy Gillespie)10:31
 "Tell Me What's Your Name" (Kathe Laursen)5:53
 "If I Only Knew" (Idrees Sulieman)6:05
 "Late Before Time"  (Kathe Laursen)11:18 (previously unissued bonus track on CD)
 "Lipstick" (Kathe Laursen)8:24
 "The Center of Copenhagen" (Idrees Sulieman)8:06
 "Happy Ending" (Per Goldschmidt)7:00

Personnel 
Idrees Suliemantrumpet
Per Goldschmidttenor saxophone, baritone saxophone
Horace Parlanpiano
Mads Vindingdouble bass
Billy Hartdrums

References 

Idrees Sulieman albums
1986 albums
SteepleChase Records albums